Island Creamery is a chain of ice cream parlors located on the Delmarva Peninsula. In 2014, TripAdvisor ranked Island Creamery as the #1 Ice Cream Parlor in the United States.

Products
Island Creamery offers a variety of frozen foods at every location, including Homemade Ice Cream, Ice Cream Cakes, and Milkshakes.

Ice Cream Flavors
Island Creamery is known locally for its large assortment of unique flavors, including Bourbon Caramel Crunch, Cake Batter, and Wallops Rocket Fuel, a flavor named after the Wallops Island Flight Facility.

Locations
Island Creamery operates 3 locations on Delmarva:
Chincoteague, Virginia - Original Location, opened in 1975
Berlin, Maryland - Opened in 2017
Salisbury, Maryland - Opened in 2018

References

Restaurants in Maryland
Restaurant chains
Ice cream parlors in the United States